Voragonema pedunculata is a small red hydrozoan with a diameter reaching 4 cm. It has 1000-2000 fine tentacles. It is found in the Pacific Ocean with known distributions in Monterey Bay, California, United States and the San Clemente Basin.

References

Rhopalonematidae
Animals described in 1913